Modison Salayedvwa Magagula (born 1958) is a Swazi playwright, poet and short-story writer.

Biography
Magagula attended William Pitcher College in Manzini where he obtained a diploma in teaching. He began his career as a playwright in 1986 after attending a workshop for writers in the Swazi capital of Mbabane. In 1989 he started a travelling theatre called the Siphila Nje Drama Society, the first of its kind in Swaziland. He writes plays, poems and short-stories in SiSwati on themes including postcolonialism, sectarianism, juvenile delinquency, relationships and AIDS. In 2008,  he received an award from the Swaziland National Council of Arts and Culture (SNCAC) for his work in the development of the arts in Swaziland.

Bibliography
1987: Ingcamu (A Journey's Provision)
1988: Idubukele (Dinner is Served!)
1989: Indlanganye (Our Gain)
1989: Asingeni Lapho (It is None of Our Business)
1990: Tentile (Hoist with your Own Petard)
1990: Kwesukesukela (Once Upon a Time)
1997: Bungani Bebangani

References

1958 births
Living people
Swazi writers